The Government Degree College Uri is a University of Kashmir-affiliated degree college located in Uri in the  Baramulla district of the Indian-administered state of Jammu and Kashmir. It is an autonomous co-educational degree college recognised by University Grants Commission of India under 2(f) and 12(B) of UGC Act, 1956.

Establishment
The Government of Jammu and Kashmir established the college during the Chief-Ministership of Mufti Mohammad Sayeed under Prime Minister's Reconstruction Plan in the year 2005. It was established by Govt. of J&K with the aim of creating learning opportunities for the students of the educationally backward hilly, border area of Uri, district Baramulla.

Location
It is in main town Uri, on Srinagar-Muzzaffarabad national highway near LOC (Line of Control).

Courses offered
The college offers bachelor courses in various subjects.

Bachelor courses
Bachelor of Arts (B.A)
Bachelor of Science  (Medical)
Bachelor of Science  (Non-Medical)

References

Degree colleges in Kashmir Division
Universities and colleges in Jammu and Kashmir
University of Kashmir
Uri, Jammu and Kashmir
2005 establishments in Jammu and Kashmir
Educational institutions established in 2005